The following are the winners of the 20th annual ENnie Awards, held in 2020:

Judges' Spotlight Winners 

 Benjamin Adelman – Sleepaway,  Author: Jay Dragon
 Rachel Campbell – Glitter Hearts, Leatherman Games,  Author: Greg Leatherman
 Christopher Gath – Refractions in Glasston, Chaosium Inc.,  Authors: Taylor University PWR Press, Sam Guinsatao, Carson Jacobs, T.R. Knight, Joy Lemont, Elijah Oates, Rayce Patterson, Emily Pawlowski, J. Tucker White
 Shauna Ratliff – Knarls Candy Compendium,  Authors: Makenzie De Armas, Levi Phipps
 James Surano – Hit the Streets, Defend the Block, Lost Highway Games,  Author: Rich Rogers

Gold and Silver Winners

References

 
ENnies winners